The McCabe-Powers Body Company was a producer of carriages and later of utility trucks and other motor vehicles. The company was founded in St. Louis, Missouri in 1877 by James H. McCabe and Thomas O'Farrell as "James H. McCabe and Thomas O'Farell, Carriage Builders". This eventually became the McCabe-Bierman Wagon Company, and, from 1906 (after Edward J. Powers, Sr. had become a partner), the McCabe-Powers Carriage Company.

Originally producing horse-drawn wagons, the company later made motor-driven cars, specializing in hearses, passenger limos, delivery vehicles, utility vehicles, and producing military vehicles during World War II. A wagon produced by McCabe-Bierman was used in the 1904 World's Fair, winning a silver medal for design. This wagonette is now on display at the Missouri History Museum in Forest Park, St. Louis.

The company remained in the hands of the Powers family until it was sold in 1983 and no longer produced truck bodies.

External links
McCabe Powers Historical Museum, website dedicated to the history of the company

Defunct motor vehicle manufacturers of the United States
Manufacturing companies based in St. Louis

Coachbuilders of the United States